The 1926 Ohio Bobcats football team was an American football team that represented Ohio University in the Buckeye Athletic Association ( BAA) and the Ohio Athletic Conference (OAC) during the 1926 college football season. In their third season under head coach Don Peden, the Bobcats compiled a 5–2–1 record and outscored opponents by a total of 111 to 17.

Schedule

References

Ohio
Ohio
Ohio Bobcats football seasons
Ohio Bobcats football